The following is a list of notable deaths in February 2010.

Entries for each day are listed alphabetically by surname. A typical entry lists information in the following sequence:
 Name, age, country of citizenship at birth, subsequent country of citizenship (if applicable), reason for notability, cause of death (if known), and reference.

February 2010

1
Willie Anku, 60, Ghanaian music theorist, ethnomusicologist, composer, and performer, motor accident.
Jim Atherton, 86, Welsh footballer.
Julian Edwin Bailes, Sr., 95, American politician, attorney and judge, stroke.
Jack Brisco, 68, American professional wrestler, complications from open heart surgery.
David Brown, 93, American film producer (Jaws, Cocoon, A Few Good Men), renal failure.
Rodolfo de Anda, 66, Mexican actor, thrombosis.
Steingrímur Hermannsson, 81, Icelandic politician, Prime Minister (1983–1987, 1988–1991).
Bobby Kirk, 82, Scottish footballer, dementia.
Atsushi Kuroi, 40, Japanese professional drifting driver, motorcycle accident.
Azzeddine Laraki, 80, Moroccan politician, Prime Minister (1986–1992).
Peter Martell, 71, Italian film actor.
Justin Mentell, 27, American actor (Boston Legal, G-Force), car accident.
Subir Raha, 61, Indian executive, chairman and managing director of ONGC (2001–2006), lung cancer.
Jaap van der Poll, 95, Dutch Olympic javelin thrower (1936 Summer Olympics).

2
Juan del Campo, 87, Spanish Olympic field hockey player.
Louisa Benson Craig, 68, Burmese-born American beauty queen and community leader.
Myron Donovan Crocker, 94, American federal judge.
Cochin Haneefa, 58, Indian Malayalam film actor, multiple organ failure.
Futa Helu, 75, Tongan philosopher.
Paul Herlinger, 80, American voice actor,
Tahir Hussain, 72, Indian film director, producer and writer, cardiac arrest.
Bernard Kates, 87, American actor, sepsis and pneumonia.
Svetozar Kurepa, 80, Croatian mathematician.
Aleen Leslie, 101, American screenwriter (A Date with Judy), pneumonia.
Rosa Lobato de Faria, 77, Portuguese writer and actress, complications from anemia.
Eustace Mullins, 86, American political writer, author and biographer, stroke.
Rex Nettleford, 76, Jamaican scholar and choreographer, heart attack.
*Ng Teng Fong, 82, Chinese-born Singaporean businessman, complications from a cerebral hemorrhage.
Jens-Anton Poulsson, 91, Norwegian military officer and resistance fighter (heavy water sabotage).
Srinivas Rangaraj, 77, Indian cricketer.
Nelli Shkolnikova, 82, Ukrainian-born Australian violinist and educator, cancer.
*Raymond Wang Chong Lin, 88, Chinese Roman Catholic prelate, Bishop of Zhaoxian, cerebral hemorrhage.
Donald Wiseman, 91, British Assyriologist.
William Yurko, 83, Canadian politician, MP for Edmonton East (1979–1984).

3
Faiza Ashraf, 26, Pakistani-Norwegian shop assistant, strangulation.
Claudio Corti, 81, Italian mountaineer.
*Elazar ben Tsedaka ben Yitzhaq, 83, Palestinian Samaritan High Priest.
Frank Fasi, 89, American politician, Mayor of Honolulu (1969–1981, 1984–1994), natural causes.
John McCallum, 91, Australian actor and television producer (Skippy the Bush Kangaroo).
Dick McGuire, 84, American basketball player, New York Knicks senior consultant, Basketball Hall of Famer, ruptured aortic aneurysm.
Gil Merrick, 88, English footballer (Birmingham City).
Princess Regina of Saxe-Meiningen, 85, German princess, wife of Otto von Habsburg.
Frances Reid, 95, American actress (Days of Our Lives).
John Rety, 79, Hungarian-born British poet and anarchist.
Lindsay Thomas, 31, Canadian stage actress, lung cancer.
Georges Wilson, 88, French actor and film director.

4
Kostas Axelos, 85, Greek philosopher.
Gul Hameed Bhatti, 63, Pakistani journalist and editor, stroke.
Bill Dudley, 88, American football player (Pittsburgh Steelers), Pro Football Hall of Famer, stroke.
Manuel Esteba, 68, Spanish film director.
Richard Lashof, 87, American mathematician, after long illness.
Tomás Mac Giolla, 86, Irish politician, after long illness.
Cecil Heftel, 85, American businessman and politician, U.S. Representative from Hawaii (1977–1986), natural causes.
D. Van Holliday, 69, American physicist, complications of cardiac surgery.
Alfred Käärmann, 87, Estonian resistance fighter, member of the Forest Brothers.
Phillip Martin, 83, American tribal chief (Mississippi Band of Choctaw Indians), stroke.
H. A. Perera, 59, Sri Lankan actor, after short illness.
Meir Pichhadze, 54, Georgian-born Israeli artist and painter, cancer.
Joseph Ignace Randrianasolo, 62, Malagasy Roman Catholic prelate, Bishop of Mahajanga (1999–2010).
Carl E. Taylor, 93, American physician and expert on international health, prostate cancer.
*Te Wei, 95, Chinese animator, respiratory failure.
Helen Tobias-Duesberg, 90, Estonian-born American composer.
Allan Wicks, 86, British organist and choirmaster.

5
Bayken Ashimov, 92, Kazakh politician.
Brendan Burke, 21, Canadian-born American ice hockey player, car accident.
Peter Calvocoressi, 97, British historian, publisher and intelligence officer.
Ian Carmichael, 89, British actor (Lucky Jim, Private's Progress, I'm All Right Jack).
Mallia Franklin, 57, American singer.
Galimzyan Khusainov, 72, Russian footballer. 
Sujit Kumar, 75, Indian actor and producer, cancer.
Frank Magid, 78, American media consultant, creator of Action News, lymphoma.
Hiroyuki Oze, 24, Japanese baseball player, suicide by jumping.
Clarke Scholes, 79, American Olympic gold medal-winning (1952) swimmer, heart failure.
Harry Schwarz, 85, South African lawyer, politician and diplomat, leader of the anti-apartheid movement, after short illness.
Brooks Thomas, 78, American publisher (Harper and Row), complications of a brain injury after a fall.

6
Micky Axton, 91, American aviator (Women Airforce Service Pilots), after short illness.
Albert Booth, 81, British politician, MP for Barrow-in-Furness (1966–1983), Secretary of State for Employment (1976–1979).
Robert Dana, 80, American poet, Iowa poet laureate (2004–2008), pancreatic cancer.
Sir John Dankworth, 82, British jazz musician.
Richard Delvy, 67, American drummer (The Bel-Airs), composer and record producer, after long illness.
Brad Ecklund, 87, American football player (New York Yanks), heart failure.
Ernest van der Eyken, 96, Belgian composer, conductor and violist.
Kipkemboi Kimeli, 43, Kenyan athlete, 1988 Olympic bronze medalist, complications from pneumonia and tuberculosis.
*Lee Yung-dug, 84, South Korean politician, Prime Minister (1994), pneumonia.
Henry A. Miley, Jr., 94, American soldier, U.S. Army four-star general.
Lady Marjorie Nellie Murray, 85, British socialite, witness at the Nuremberg and Tokyo war crimes trials.
Nancy Sweezy, 88, American folklorist, potter and writer.
Donald Welsh, 66, American publisher (Outside), drowning.

7
Lars Aspeflaten, 85, Norwegian barrister and politician.
Franco Ballerini, 45, Italian road racing cyclist, rally car accident.
Daniel Joseph Bradley, 82, British physicist.
Jean-Marie Buisset, 71, Belgian Olympic bobsledder and field hockey player, after short illness.
Bobby Dougan, 83, Scottish footballer.
André Kolingba, 73, Central African politician, President (1981–1993).
Paul LaPalme, 86, American baseball player, after long illness.
*Lim Soo-hyeok, 40, South Korean baseball player (Lotte Giants), cardiac dysrhythmia.
Mihailo Marković, 86, Serbian philosopher.
Kasturi Rajadhyaksha, 86, Indian physician.
Robert Roxby, 83, Australian cricketer.
Oscar da Silva, 89, Brazilian Olympic equestrian.
William Tenn, 89, American science fiction writer and educator, heart failure.

8
Angelo Franzosi, 88, Italian footballer.
David Froman, 71, American actor (The Edge of Night, Matlock), cancer.
Antonio Giolitti, 94, Italian politician.
Jimmie Heuga, 66, American Alpine ski racer, 1964 Olympic bronze medalist, multiple sclerosis.
Robert Hoy, 82, American actor (The Enforcer) and stuntman, cancer.
Carl Kaysen, 89, American economist, Deputy National Security Advisor (1961–1963), complications from a fall.
Dieter Klauß, 62, German Olympic hockey player.
Bernard Lander, 94, American rabbi, founder of Touro College.
John Murtha, 77, American politician, U.S. Representative from Pennsylvania (1974–2010), complications of gallbladder surgery.
Anna Samokhina, 47, Russian actress, stomach cancer.
Krzysztof Skubiszewski, 83, Polish politician, Minister of Foreign Affairs (1989–1993).
Bobby A. Suarez, 67, Filipino film producer, director and screenwriter.
Wahei Tatematsu, 62, Japanese novelist, multiple organ failure.
Bill Utterback, 79, American illustrator and caricaturist.
Isidoor Van De Wiele, 85, Belgian Olympic sprinter.

9
Abdul Karim Amu, 76, Nigerian sprinter.
Chaskel Besser, 86, Polish-born American rabbi.
John D. Butler, 94, American politician, Mayor of San Diego (1951–1955), natural causes.
Davy Coenen, 29, Belgian mountain biker, brain tumor.
Alfred Gregory, 96, British mountain climber and photojournalist.
Phil Harris, 53, American fisherman, reality television participant (Deadliest Catch), stroke.
Jacques Hétu, 71, Canadian composer, lung cancer.
Juris Kalniņš, 71, Latvian basketball player.
Albert Kligman, 93, American dermatologist, inventor of Retin-A, heart attack.
Walter Frederick Morrison, 90, American inventor, designer of the frisbee.
Francine Irving Neff, 84, American politician, Treasurer of the United States (1974–1977), heart failure.
Iza Orjonikidze, 71, Georgian writer and politician, MP (1992–1995), after long illness.
Hastings Shade, 68, American deputy tribal chief of the Cherokee Nation (1999–2003).
David W. Slater, 88, Canadian economist, civil servant and President of York University (1970–1973).
Patricia Travers, 82, American violinist, cancer.
Malcolm Vaughan, 80, British singer.
Robert Shaw Sturgis Whitman, 94, American Episcopalian priest.

10
Yosef Azran, 69, Israeli rabbi and politician, member of the Knesset (1988–1996), liver failure.
Jack Bownass, 79, Canadian ice hockey player (Montreal Canadiens, New York Rangers).
Carl Braun, 82, American basketball player (New York Knicks), natural causes.
Armando Falcão, 90, Brazilian politician, Justice Minister (1974–1979), pneumonia.
Gabriela Konevska-Trajkovska, 38, Macedonian politician, Deputy Prime Minister (2006–2008), after long illness.
Judith Paige Mitchell, 77, American television writer (The Client), cancer.
Michael Palme, 66, German sportswriter and host.
Orlando Peçanha, 74, Brazilian footballer, heart attack.
Gireesh Puthenchery, 48, Indian Malayalam lyricist and screenwriter, brain haemorrhage.
K. N. Raj, 85, Indian economist, after long illness.
Nelis J. Saunders, 88, American politician.
Fred Schaus, 84, American basketball player and coach (Los Angeles Lakers).
Enn Soosaar, 72, Estonian translator, literary critic and publicist.
*José Joaquín Trejos Fernández, 93, Costa Rican President (1966–1970), natural causes.
David Tyacke, 94, British Army general.
Eduard Vinokurov, 67, Russian Olympic fencer (1968, 1972, 1976).
Frederick C. Weyand, 93, American army general, natural causes.
Charlie Wilson, 76, American politician, U.S. Representative (1973–1997), subject of the book and movie Charlie Wilson's War, pulmonary arrest.
H. V. F. Winstone, 83, British writer and journalist, lung cancer.

11
Irina Arkhipova, 85, Russian mezzo-soprano singer, People's Artist of the USSR, cardiac arrest.
Shahid Azmi, 32, Indian lawyer, shot.
Jabez Bryce, 75, Tongan-born Anglican prelate, archbishop of Polynesia (since 1975), first Pacific Islander Anglican bishop.
Iain Burgess, 56, British-born American punk rock record producer, pulmonary embolism.
Jennifer Daugherty, 30, American torture murder victim.
Pio Filippani Ronconi, 89, Italian orientalist.
Walther Fröstell, 96, Swedish Olympic shooter.
Brian Godfrey, 69, Welsh footballer, leukaemia.
Heward Grafftey, 81, Canadian politician, MP for Brome—Missisquoi, Parkinson's disease (1958–1968, 1972–1980).
Arthur H. Hayes, Jr., 76, American public official, Commissioner of the Food and Drug Administration (1981–1983), leukemia.
Mona Hofland, 80, Norwegian actress, after long illness.
Bo Holmberg, 67, Swedish governor, widower of Anna Lindh.
Umetsugu Inoue, 86, Japanese film director, cerebral hemorrhage.
Robert Long, 77, New Zealand cricketer.
Alexander McQueen, 40, British fashion designer, suicide by hanging.
Caroline McWilliams, 64, American actress (Benson, Guiding Light, Mermaids), multiple myeloma.
Paul Rebillot, 78, American psychotherapist, respiratory failure.
E.H. Roelfzema, 62, Dutch writer, artist, poet, and musician.
David Severn, 91, British author.
Yury Sevidov, 68, Russian footballer, Soviet Top League highest goal scorer (1962).
Gladys Skillett, 91, British nurse, first Guernsey wartime deportee to give birth in captivity.
Daryle Smith, 46, American football player (Dallas Cowboys).
Duncan Tanner, 51, British historian.
Colin Ward, 85, British anarchist writer.

12
Juan Pedro Amestoy, 84, Uruguayan accountant, politician and ambassador.
Petar Borota, 56, Serbian footballer (Partizan Belgrade and Chelsea), after long illness.
Maria Ragland Davis, 52, American biologist, shot.
Ken Emerson, 82, Australian cartoonist (The Warrumbunglers).
Jerry Fahr, 85, American baseball player.
Gino Gardassanich, 87, Italian-born American football player.
Chhaya Ghosh, 69, Indian politician.
Sheldon Gilgore, 77, American physician, president of Pfizer (1971–1986) and Searle (1986–1995), pancreatic cancer.
Jake Hanna, 78, American jazz drummer, blood disease.
Adriel Johnson, 52, American biologist, shot.
Athan Karras, 82, Greek-born American advocate of Greek dance, complications from coronary artery bypass surgery.
Allan Kornblum, 71, American lawyer, counsel to the F.B.I., esophageal cancer.
Werner Krämer, 70, German footballer.
Nodar Kumaritashvili, 21, Georgian luger, national team member for the 2010 Winter Olympics, training accident.
Miro Mihovilović, 94, Croatian Olympic water polo player.
Luis Molowny, 84, Spanish footballer, heart attack.
Leroy Nash, 94, American murderer, oldest death row inmate, natural causes.
Alexis Pappas, 94, Greek-born Norwegian chemist.
G. K. Podila, 52, Indian-born American biologist, shot.
Willie Polland, 75, Scottish footballer (Heart of Midlothian).
Saleban Olad Roble, Somali government minister, injuries sustained in the 2009 Shamo Hotel bombing.
Bernard Smith, 99, American sailboat designer, liver cancer.
Grethe Sønck, 80, Danish actress and singer, natural causes.

13
Ralph G. Anderson, 86, American engineer and farmer.
Lucille Clifton, 73, American poet, Poet Laureate of Maryland (1974–1985).
Jock Ferguson, 64, Scottish-born Australian politician, Western Australian Legislative Council (since 2009), heart attack.
Werner Forman, 89, Czech-born British photographer.
Cy Grant, 90, Guyanese-born British actor and activist.
Dale Hawkins, 73, American rockabilly musician, colorectal cancer.
James D. Johnson, 85, American politician and jurist, Arkansas Supreme Court Justice (1959–1966), suicide by gunshot.
Raymond Mason, 87, British sculptor.
Robert J. Myers, 97, American politician, co-creator of the Social Security program, respiratory failure.
Jamil Nasser, 77, American jazz musician, cardiac arrest.
José María Pasquini Durán, 70, Argentine journalist, cardiac arrest.
John Reed, 94, British actor.
Red Rocha, 86, American basketball player and coach (Hawaii Rainbow Warriors).
Roger Thatcher, 83, British statistician.
Gareth Wigan, 78, British film studio executive (Star Wars, Chariots of Fire), after short illness.

14
Ram Sarup Ankhi, 77, Indian writer, poet, and novelist.
Audrey Collins, 94, British cricket player and administrator.
John Downey, 89, British Royal Air Force officer.
Doug Fieger, 57, American musician (The Knack), lung cancer.
Dick Francis, 89, British jockey and novelist (Dead Cert).
Helge Høva, 81, Norwegian politician.
Amos Funk, 98, American farm preservationist.
Linnart Mäll, 71, Estonian historian, orientalist, translator and politician, cancer.
John Ruan, 96, American entrepreneur and philanthropist, Parkinson's disease.
John Thorbjarnarson, 52, American conservationist and crocodile expert, malaria.
Jerzy Turek, 76, Polish actor.
*Zhang Yalin, 28, Chinese football player, lymphoma.

15
W. H. Clatworthy, 94, American mathematician.
Juan Carlos González, 85, Uruguayan football player.
Ian Gray, 46, Australian football player, homicide by prohibited drug.
Jeanne M. Holm, 88, American general, pneumonia.
Bill Kajikawa, 97, American basketball coach (Arizona State Sun Devils).
Dana Kirk, 74, American basketball coach (Memphis Tigers), heart attack.
Rigmor Mydtskov, 84, Danish court photographer.
Fred Peacock, 93, Canadian politician.
Aníbal Portillo, 95, Salvadoran military officer, head of state (1961–1962).
Sylvia Pressler, 75, American jurist, lymphoma.
Alfred Surratt, 87, American baseball player (Kansas City Monarchs), co-founder of the Negro Leagues Baseball Museum.
Art Van Damme, 89, American jazz musician and accordionist, pneumonia.
George Waring, 84, British actor (Coronation Street), cancer.
Claud William Wright, 93, British civil servant and scientific expert.

16
Jim Bibby, 65, American baseball player (Pittsburgh Pirates), bone cancer.
John Davis Chandler, 73, American actor (Adventures in Babysitting, The Outlaw Josey Wales).
William E. Gordon, 92, American inventor, designer of the Arecibo Radio Telescope, natural causes.
Martin Grossman, 45, American convicted murderer, execution by lethal injection.
Jim Harmon, 76, American science fiction writer, heart attack.
Ronald Howes, 83, American inventor, designer of Easy-Bake Oven.
Andrew Koenig, 41, American actor (Growing Pains), suicide.
Ino Kolbe, 95, German Esperanto expert.
Ian Roderick Macneil, 80, American-born lawyer and Scottish clan chief.
Mike Pittilo, 55, British biologist and educator, Principal of Robert Gordon University.
*Wan Chi Keung, 53, Hong Kong footballer, actor, and businessman, nasopharyngeal carcinoma.
Jim Waugh, 76, American baseball player.

17
Roger-Émile Aubry, 86, Swiss-born Bolivian Roman Catholic prelate, Vicar Apostolic of Reyes (1973–1999).
Chaturvedi Badrinath, 76-77, Indian officer and author.
Lottie Beck, 81, American baseball player (AAGPBL)
Arnold Beichman, 96, American writer and journalist.
Bjørn Benkow, 70, Norwegian journalist.
Giulio de Florian, 74, Italian Olympic cross-country skier.
Makoto Fujita, 76, Japanese actor and comedian, ruptured artery.
Kathryn Grayson, 88, American actress and singer.
Ruby Hunter, 54, Australian singer and musician, heart attack.
Abdulkhakim Ismailov, 93, Russian Red Army soldier, World War II hero, natural causes.
David Lelei, 38, Kenyan middle distance runner, car accident.
Ignatius P. Lobo, 90, Indian Roman Catholic prelate, Bishop of Belgaum (1967–1994).
Martha Mercader, 83, Argentine politician and writer.
Hans Ørberg, 89, Danish linguist.
Witold Skaruch, 80, Polish actor.
Luigi Ulivelli, 74, Italian Olympic athlete.

18
John Babcock, 109, Canadian soldier, Canada's last surviving World War I veteran.
Erwin Bachmann, 88, German Waffen-SS officer.
Asta Backman, 93, Finnish actress.
Bob Chakales, 82, American baseball player (Cleveland Indians).
Barton Childs, 93, American physician and geneticist, complications of lung cancer.
Amlan Datta, 85, Indian economist and teacher.
Alan Gordon, 65, Scottish football player, cancer.
Fernando Krahn, 75, Chilean plastic artist and illustrator.
Emilio Lavazza, 78, Italian businessman, President of Lavazza Coffee (1979–2008).
Nirmal Pandey, 48, Indian actor, heart attack.
Richard Proulx, 72, American choral conductor and composer.
Ariel Ramírez, 88, Argentine composer and pianist, pneumonia.

19
George Cisar, 99, American baseball player (Brooklyn Dodgers).
Daddy, 16, American Pit Bull Terrier, appeared with owner Cesar Millan in Dog Whisperer, euthanized due to cancer.
Jamie Gillis, 66, American pornographic film actor, melanoma.
Bruno Gironcoli, 73, Austrian sculptor, after long illness.
Lionel Jeffries, 83, British film actor, screenwriter and director.
Rudy Larriva, 94, American animator and animation director (Looney Tunes, The Bugs Bunny/Road Runner Show).
Rafael Muñoz Núñez, 85, Mexican Roman Catholic prelate, Bishop of Zacatecas (1972–1984) and Aguascalientes (1984–1998).
Elli Parvo, 95, Italian film actress.
Giovanni Pettenella, 66, Italian Olympic cyclist.
Walter Plowright, 86, British veterinary scientist.
Laura Spurr, 64, American chairwoman of the Nottawaseppi Huron Band of Potawatomi since 2003, heart attack.
Bull Verweij, 100, Dutch businessman, co-founder of Radio Veronica.
Mladen Veža, 94, Croatian painter.

20
Chandan Mal Baid, 87-88, Indian politician.
Ghantasala Balaramayya, 78, Indian producer, director and actor.
Bobby Cox, 76, Scottish footballer (Dundee).
Georges Charachidzé, 80, French scholar of the Caucasian cultures.
Juanita Goggins, 75, American politician, first black woman in South Carolina Legislature, hypothermia. (estimated date of death)
Linda Grover, 76, American peace activist, founder of Global Family Day, uterine and ovarian cancer.
Alexander Haig, 85, American politician and diplomat, Secretary of State (1981–1982), complications from an infection.
Sam Hamilton, 54, American public official, Director of U.S. Fish and Wildlife Service since 2009, heart attack.
Sandy Kenyon, 87, American character and voice actor (The Twilight Zone, Here Comes Garfield).
Henry Kučera, 85, Czech-born American linguist.
Niall McCrudden, 45, Irish optician and socialite.
Padmanabham, 78, Indian actor, heart attack. 
Jason Wood, 38, British comedian and reality television contestant (Strictly Come Dancing).

21
Seth G. Atwood, 92, American industrialist, community leader, and horological collector.
Bob Doe, 89, British airman, Royal Air Force flying ace.
Jacek Karpiński, 83, Polish computer scientist.
Veini Kontinen, 82, Finnish Olympic skier.
Vladimir Motyl, 82, Russian film director and scenarist, cervical fractures and pneumonia.
Albader Parad, Filipino militant (Abu Sayyaf), shot.
Vesa Pulliainen, 52, Finnish Olympic footballer.
William E. Skillend, 83, British scholar of Korean language.
George Strickland, 84, American baseball player (Pittsburgh Pirates, Cleveland Indians).
James Wieghart, 76, American newspaper editor (New York Daily News), pneumonia.

22
*Juan Angel Belda Dardiñá, 83, Spanish Roman Catholic prelate, Bishop of Jaca (1978–1983) and León (1983–1987).
Michael J. Bradley, 76, British diplomat, Governor of the Turks and Caicos Islands (1987–1993).
Robert Carter, 82, American priest and gay rights activist, a founder of the National Gay and Lesbian Task Force.
Fred Chaffart, 74, Belgian businessperson.
Henry Cosgrove, 87, Australian judge, Judge of the Supreme Court of Tasmania (1977–1988).
Robin Davies, 56, British actor, lung cancer.
Hillar Eller, 70, Estonian politician, former chairman of the Estonian Left Party (1995–1996).
Eugene Lambert, 82, Irish puppeteer and ventriloquist (Wanderly Wagon).
Nelly Landry, 93, Belgian-born French tennis player.
Rozy Munir, 67, Indonesian diplomat, ambassador to Qatar, liver cancer.
Menachem Porush, 93, Israeli politician, Member of Knesset (1959–1975, 1977–1994).
Bobby Smith, 56, Scottish footballer, cancer.
Charles Stenvig, 82, American politician, Mayor of Minneapolis (1969–1973, 1975–1977).
Mohammed Zaman, 44, Afghan political and military leader, victim of suicide bombing.

23
John Hollings Addison, 80, Canadian politician and business executive.
Vyacheslav Andreyuk, 64, Soviet Russian football player.
Clarence R. Autery, 76-77, American general.
Bill Burtenshaw, 84, British footballer.
Michael Clancy, 60, Saint Helena politician and Governor (2004–2007), cancer.
Mervyn Jones, 87, British journalist, biographer and novelist.
Abune Zena Markos, 72, Ethiopian Archbishop, complications from pneumonia.
Wyn Morris, 81, British conductor.
Gerhardt Neef, 63, German footballer (Rangers), throat cancer.
Henri Salmide, 90, German World War II naval officer, saved Bordeaux port from destruction.
Mosi Tatupu, 54, American football player (New England Patriots).
Derek Vanlint, 78, British-born Canadian cinematographer (Alien), short illness.
Orlando Zapata, 42, Cuban dissident, hunger strike.

24
Antonio Alegre, 85, Argentine businessman, President of Boca Juniors (1985–1995).
Delmo da Silva, 55, Brazilian Olympic sprinter.
Ang It-hong, 82, Taiwanese singer, songwriter, composer and actor, pancreatic cancer.
Dawn Brancheau, 40, American SeaWorld trainer, killer whale attack.
Carlo Cicuttini, 63, Italian neo-fascist and terrorist.
Jake Elder, 73, American NASCAR crew chief, natural causes.
Howard George, 75, American Olympic wrestler.
Richard Gruenwald, 93, Canadian politician, Alberta MLA for Lethbridge-West (1971–1975).
Dagfin Huseby, 87, Norwegian Olympic wrestler.
C. R. Johnson, 26, American newschool skier, skiing accident.
Birgitta Lindqvist, 67, Swedish Olympic cross-country skier.
Charles MacArthur, 89, Canadian politician, MLA for Inverness (1983–1998).

25
Henry Barron, 81, Irish jurist, Supreme Court of Ireland (1997–2003), after short illness.
Ernst Beyeler, 88, Swiss art collector.
Barbara Bray, 85, British translator.
Aaron Cohen, 79, American aerospace engineer, Director of Lyndon B. Johnson Space Center (1986–1993), after long illness.
İhsan Doğramacı, 94, Turkish physician and academic, multiple organ dysfunction syndrome.
Vladislav Galkin, 38, Russian actor, heart failure.
Gheorghe Gaston Marin, 91, Romanian politician.
Donald Merrifield, 81, American Jesuit, first president of Loyola Marymount University (1973–1984), heart attack.
John Bernard McDowell, 88, American Roman Catholic prelate, Titular Bishop of Tamazuca (1966–1996).
Oscar Ravina, 79, Polish-born American violinist.
David Soyer, 87, American cellist (Guarneri Quartet).
Efren Torres, 66, Mexican former world flyweight champion boxer, heart attack.
Ali Tounsi, 76, Algerian police official, Chief of National Police, shot.
Tuomo Tuormaa, 83, Finnish Olympic sprint canoer.
Ahmet Vardar, 73, Turkish journalist and writer, pancreatic cancer.
Frank Williams, 73, American architect (Trump Palace, Four Seasons Hotel New York), esophageal cancer.

26
María Elisa Álvarez Obaya, 76, Spanish pharmacist.
Louis Fabian Bachrach, Jr., 92, American political photographer (Bachrach Studios).
Violet Barclay, 87, American comic book artist.
Tom Bass, 93, Australian sculptor.
Barry Bowen, 64, Belizean bottling magnate and politician, plane crash.
Francisco Cabrera Santos, 63, Venezuelan politician, mayor of Valencia, Carabobo.
Bernard Coutaz, 87, French music publisher, founder of Harmonia Mundi.
Richard Devon, 84, American character actor (Lassie), vascular disease.
Charles le Gai Eaton, 89, Swiss-born British diplomat and author.
Andrew Jaffe, 71, American journalist (Adweek), revived the Clio Awards, multiple myeloma.
Ivaylo Kirov, 63, Bulgarian Olympic basketball player.
Robert McCall, 90, American artist, heart failure.
Nujabes, 36, Japanese hip hop composer (Samurai Champloo), car accident.
Jacques J. Polak, 95, Dutch economist.
Dave Sheasby, 69, British playwright, radio producer and dramatist.

27
David Bankier, 63, German-born Israeli Holocaust scholar.
Black Bear Island, c. 4, Irish Thoroughbred racehorse, euthanized.
Larry Cassidy, 56, British bass guitarist and singer (Section 25).
Charlie Crowe, 85, English footballer (Newcastle United), Alzheimer's disease.
Frans De Blaes, 100, Belgian Olympic sprint canoer.
Nanaji Deshmukh, 93, Indian social activist and politician, after long illness.
Anna Fárová, 81, Czech photography historian and advocate, Charter 77 signatory.
Madeleine Ferron, 87, Canadian author, Alzheimer's disease.
Eli Fischer-Jørgensen, 99, Danish linguist and World War II resistance member.
Rosemary Goldie, 94, Australian Roman Catholic theologian, Under-Secretary of the Pontifical Council for the Laity (1967–1976).
Jonathan May, 51, American cellist and conductor, stroke.
František Nedvěd, 59, Czech Olympic weightlifter.
Hank Rosenstein, 89, American basketball player (New York Knicks), heart failure.
Nathan Scott, 94, American film and television composer (Lassie, The Twilight Zone, Dragnet), natural causes.
Oleg Stepanov, 70, Russian judoka, 1964 Olympic bronze medal winner.
Wendy Toye, 92, British filmmaker.
Roger Veeser, 90, Swiss Olympic athlete.

28
David Amland, 79, American painter and art educator.
Edward L. Athey, 88, American football, basketball and baseball player, baseball and basketball coach.
Martin Benson, 91, British actor (The Omen, Cleopatra, Goldfinger).
Adam Blacklaw, 72, Scottish footballer (Burnley).
Gerald Butler, 79, British jurist and broadcaster, heart attack.
Theodore Cross, 86, American publisher and civil rights activist, heart failure.
Bohdan Ejmont, 82, Polish actor.
Rose Gray, 71, British restaurateur (The River Café) and food writer, brain cancer.
Gene Greytak, 84, American impressionist (Pope John Paul II), cancer.
Chushiro Hayashi, 89, Japanese astrophysicist, pneumonia.
Phillip Law, 97, Australian scientist and explorer (Australian Antarctic Territory).
José Mindlin, 95, Brazilian businessman and bibliophile, multiple organ dysfunction syndrome.
Carlos Montemayor, 62, Mexican writer, stomach cancer.
Nikolay Surov, 62, Russian Olympic rower.
Jorge Villamil, 80, Colombian composer, complications from diabetes.
George Watt, 92, Australian rugby league footballer.
Tom Wolk, 58, American bass guitarist (Hall & Oates), heart attack.

References

2010-02
 02